The 1947 Cal Aggies football team represented the College of Agriculture at Davis—now known as the University of California, Davis—as a member of the Far Western Conference (FWC) during the 1947 college football season. The team was outscored by its opponents 123 to 116 for the season. The Cal Aggies played home games at A Street field on campus in Davis, California.

Schedule

Notes

References

Cal Aggies
UC Davis Aggies football seasons
Northern California Athletic Conference football champion seasons
Cal Aggies football